The 1882 New South Wales colonial election was held between 30 November and 21 December 1882. This election was for all of the 113 seats in the New South Wales Legislative Assembly and it was conducted in 40 single-member constituencies, 26 2-member constituencies, three 3-member constituencies and three 4-member constituencies, all with a first past the post system. Suffrage was limited to adult male British subjects, resident in New South Wales. The previous parliament of New South Wales was dissolved on 23 November 1882 by the Governor, Lord Augustus Loftus, on the advice of the Premier, Sir Henry Parkes.

There was no recognisable party structure at this election; instead the government was determined by a loose, shifting factional system.

Key dates

Results
{{Australian elections/Title row
| table style = float:right;clear:right;margin-left:1em;
| title        = New South Wales colonial election, 30 November – 21 December 1882
| house        = Legislative Assembly
| series       = New South Wales colonial election
| back         = 1880
| forward      = 1885
| enrolled     = 
| total_votes  = 164,515
| turnout %    = 56.69
| turnout chg  = −5.25
| informal     = 2,047
| informal %   = 2.10
| informal chg = +0.14
}}

|}

References

See also
 Members of the New South Wales Legislative Assembly, 1882–1885
 Candidates of the 1882 New South Wales colonial election

1882
1882 elections in Australia
1880s in New South Wales
November 1882 events
December 1882 events